Suhasi Goradia Dhami is an Indian actress and model. She is known for portraying Abha in Yahaaan Main Ghar Ghar Kheli and double role as Vedika Mathur and Vedika Pratab in Aap Ke Aa Jane Se. She appeared in KK's music video titled 'Aasman Ke".

Early life
Dhami is a trained classical dancer since childhood.

Career

She began her acting career in 2004 when she appeared in an episode of K. Street Pali Hill as Jugnu Khandelwaal. In 2005, she was cast in Raat Hone Ko Hai, Poorav Ya Paschim and Home Sweet Home. In 2006, she landed a role in two serials Aek Chabhi Hai Padoss Mein as the lead and Antriksh-ek Amar katha as Rajkumari Urmi. 
In 2009, she was cast in Yahaaan Main Ghar Ghar Kheli as Abha. After Yahaaan Main Ghar Ghar Kheli ended in July 2012, few months later, she joined Aaj Ki Housewife Hai... Sab Jaanti Hai as Sona Kanhaiyya Chaturvedi which premiered in December 2012.

In 2012, she participated as a contestant in Nach Baliye 5 alongside her husband Jaisheel Dhami, where she finished as the second runner up of the show. In June 2014, she joined the mythological series Devon Ke Dev...Mahadev on Life OK as Goddess Parvati alongside Mohit Raina. After taking a 3-year break from TV, she returned to acting in late 2017, when she landed the lead role of Vedika Mathur and Vedika Pratab on Zee TV's new show Aap Ke Aa Jane Se opposite actor Karan Jotwani. In June 2018, she featured in an episode of Piya Albela.

Personal life
She is married to Jaisheel Dhami and has a son, Kabir Dhami (born. 2015).  Drashti Dhami is her sister-in-law.

Television

Films

Awards and nominations

References

External links

 

Living people
Place of birth missing (living people)
Indian television actresses
Indian soap opera actresses
Year of birth missing (living people)